Lorne Douglas Campbell (October 8, 1879 – May 6, 1957) was a Canadian professional ice hockey player who played 140 games in various professional leagues, including the Western Pennsylvania Hockey League (WPHL) and International Professional Hockey League (IPHL).

Playing career
Lorne Campbell first played senior hockey for the Montreal Hockey Club in his hometown of Montreal. He played for the organization's second team before joining the main squad for the 1900–01 season. He then turned professional in the Western Pennsylvania Hockey League (WPHL) with the Pittsburgh Bankers in the 1901–02 season. He played three seasons with the Bankers before joining the Pittsburgh Pros team in the IPHL, which was a merged team of the best WPHL players.

Campbell played three seasons in the IPHL, also spending short stints with the Portage Lakes Hockey Club and the Calumet Miners. Campbell was one of the most prominent goal scorers in the IPHL's short history, ending up with both most goals and most games played at the conclusion of the league in 1907.

For the 1907–08 season, Campbell returned to Canada to play for the Winnipeg Maple Leafs of the Manitoba Professional Hockey League (MPHL). That season he played for Winnipeg in its unsuccessful Stanley Cup challenge. He played one season with the Pittsburgh Athletic Club of the WPHL, and also one game with the Winnipeg Strathconas of the MPHL, before finishing his career with one season in the National Hockey Association (NHA) with Cobalt in 1910. In 1915–16, Campbell played on the Pittsburgh Winter Garden hockey team, an amateur team based in Pittsburgh.

Career statistics

Source: Total Hockey, eliteprospects.com and sihrhockey.org

Awards & records
 1903, 1904 – WPHL First All-Star team
 1906 – IPHL Second All-Star team
 1907 – IPHL First All-Star team
Source: Total Hockey

References

Bibliography

Notes

Anglophone Quebec people
Canadian ice hockey centres
Ice hockey people from Montreal
Montreal Hockey Club players
Pittsburgh Bankers players
Pittsburgh Professionals players
Portage Lakes Hockey Club players
Calumet Miners players
Winnipeg Maple Leafs players
Cobalt Silver Kings players
1879 births
1957 deaths